Buri Wolio is an Arabic/Jawi script modified to write Wolio, a language spoken in and around Baubau, the capital of Buton, Southeast Sulawesi, Indonesia. Generally, this script is same with Jawi script, except in Buri Wolio, vowel sounds are symbolized. This script has 22 letters, 17 letters from Arabic alphabet and 5 letters from Jawi script.

See also 
 Pegon alphabet
 Jawi script

References

External links 
 Manuskrip Buton: Keistimewaan dan Nilai Budaya

Arabic alphabets
Indonesian scripts